Cesar von Düben (24 November 1819 – 18 September 1888) was a Swedish photographer, explorer and writer. A pioneering photographer working with the photographic process called daguerreotype, Von Düben set up, according to paper trails, the earliest known commercial photographic studio in Portuguese Macau (now part of Macau). In addition, he wrote on the topic of travel literature.

Early life 
Cesar von Düben was born a freiherr on 24 November 1819, in Stockholm, Sweden-Norway (now part of Sweden), and was the fifth of six children of Anders Gustaf and Carolina Maria von Düben (née Eckhardt), an immigrant from Swedish Pomerania (now part of Germany). His father was a painter and a military personnel.

Career 
Von Düben left Sweden in 1843, and spent fifteen years abroad and took up photography. He practiced in Southeast Asia, e.g. Mexico, Manila, Shanghai, Singapore, and in Macau in the 1850s, where he set up a photographic studio, which he announced in local newspapers. He then traveled to Hong Kong, where he set up the same business. Von Düben stayed longer than planned in the cities mentioned. He operated as a photographer at the Hotel der Nederlanden in 1857 too. Moreover, Von Düben and Herman Husband were the first to introduce daguerreotype photography in Shanghai.

In addition, he traveled through India, which he wrote about.

In 1871, Von Düben published a travelogue on the French Guiana, California, China, and the East Indies.

In 1886, Von Düben published another travelogue, Memories from Java.

Von Düben married writer Augusta Lillistråle on 18 June 1860. The couple had a daughter named Ingeborg, born in 1862.

Von Düben died on 18 September 1888, aged 68, in Skövde, Västergötland.

Bibliography 

 Resor uti Guiana, Mexico, Californien, China och Ostindien, företagna under åren 1843–1858, 1871 (in Swedish) – via Google Books.

See also 

 History of photography

References

Further reading 

 
 

1819 births
1888 deaths
Barons of Sweden
Cesar
Swedish people of German descent
19th-century diarists
19th-century Swedish photographers
19th-century travelers
19th-century Swedish writers
Writers from Stockholm
Pioneers of photography